Kingston is a small town at the southernmost end of Lake Wakatipu, just north of the border of Otago and Southland, in New Zealand's South Island. It is 47 kilometres south of Queenstown by a road, "The Devil's Staircase", which winds between the lake to the west and The Remarkables mountains to the east. It is 70 kilometres north of Lumsden, and close to the headwaters of the Mataura River.

History
Kingston was originally named 'St Johns'  after police commissioner St. John Branigan.

Demographics
Kingston is described by Statistics New Zealand as a rural settlement. It is part of the much larger Kingston statistical area.

Kingston settlement had a population of 306 at the 2018 New Zealand census, an increase of 108 people (54.5%) since the 2013 census, and an increase of 159 people (108.2%) since the 2006 census. There were 135 households. There were 156 males and 150 females, giving a sex ratio of 1.04 males per female. The median age was 37.5 years (compared with 37.4 years nationally), with 51 people (16.7%) aged under 15 years, 45 (14.7%) aged 15 to 29, 186 (60.8%) aged 30 to 64, and 24 (7.8%) aged 65 or older.

Ethnicities were 92.2% European/Pākehā, 5.9% Māori, 2.0% Pacific peoples, 2.9% Asian, and 2.0% other ethnicities (totals add to more than 100% since people could identify with multiple ethnicities).

Although some people objected to giving their religion, 61.8% had no religion, 20.6% were Christian, 1.0% were Hindu, 1.0% were Buddhist and 3.9% had other religions.

Of those at least 15 years old, 66 (25.9%) people had a bachelor or higher degree, and 33 (12.9%) people had no formal qualifications. The median income was $49,600, compared with $31,800 nationally. The employment status of those at least 15 was that 201 (78.8%) people were employed full-time, 24 (9.4%) were part-time, and 3 (1.2%) were unemployed.

Kingston statistical area

Kingston had a population of 348 at the 2018 New Zealand census, an increase of 111 people (46.8%) since the 2013 census, and an increase of 147 people (73.1%) since the 2006 census. There were 144 households. There were 180 males and 168 females, giving a sex ratio of 1.07 males per female. The median age was 35.4 years (compared with 37.4 years nationally), with 57 people (16.4%) aged under 15 years, 60 (17.2%) aged 15 to 29, 201 (57.8%) aged 30 to 64, and 27 (7.8%) aged 65 or older.

Ethnicities were 92.2% European/Pākehā, 6.0% Māori, 1.7% Pacific peoples, 4.3% Asian, and 1.7% other ethnicities (totals add to more than 100% since people could identify with multiple ethnicities).

The proportion of people born overseas was 25.9%, compared with 27.1% nationally.

Although some people objected to giving their religion, 62.9% had no religion, 20.7% were Christian, 0.9% were Hindu, 0.9% were Buddhist and 4.3% had other religions.

Of those at least 15 years old, 78 (26.8%) people had a bachelor or higher degree, and 36 (12.4%) people had no formal qualifications. The median income was $49,000, compared with $31,800 nationally. 60 people (20.6%) earned over $70,000 compared to 17.2% nationally. The employment status of those at least 15 was that 228 (78.4%) people were employed full-time, 30 (10.3%) were part-time, and 3 (1.0%) were unemployed.

Transport
The Kingston Flyer historic railway service is closely associated with the town.  It operated over a 14 kilometre long preserved section of the former Kingston Branch, which provided a rail link from the city of Invercargill to Kingston for over a century, opening in 1878 and closing in 1979 after a section of track between Garston and Athol was washed out in a storm.

References

External links

Populated places in Otago
Queenstown-Lakes District
Populated places on Lake Wakatipu